Polygrammodes sabelialis is a moth in the family Crambidae. It was described by Achille Guenée in 1854. It is found in India, Myanmar, China and Taiwan.

References

Spilomelinae
Moths described in 1854
Moths of Asia